Jill Jack is an American singer-songwriter based in Ferndale, Michigan. As of December 2016, she has released 11 albums, ranging from soul to rock, to folk and country.  She leads a band of the same name, as well as a jazz ensemble dedicated to standards, "Jill Jack and the American Songbook Band."

Three of her CDs – Live and Unplugged in 2005, Moon and the Morning After in 2006, Songwriter Sessions in 2010 – won Detroit Music Awards for Outstanding Acoustic/Folk Recording.  Writing for Allmusic, Thom Jurek called Moon and the Morning After, "an exceptionally honest rock & roll record, ... one that delivers musically as well as lyrically in spades and diamonds."

Discography

Studio albums

Live albums

Singles

Awards

Detroit Music Awards

|-
! scope="row" | 1997
| Jill Jack
| Outstanding Vocalist (Pop/Rock)
| 
|-
! scope="row" | 1997
| Jill Jack
| New Group/Performer Deserving Wider Recognition
| 
|-
! scope="row" | 1998
| Jill Jack
| Outstanding Artist/Group (Acoustic/Folk)
| 
|-
! scope="row" | 1998
| Jill Jack
| Outstanding Local Artist/Group (Rock/Pop)
| 
|-
! scope="row" | 1998
| Jill Jack
| Outstanding New Group (Acoustic/Folk)
| 
|-
! scope="row" | 1998
| Watch Over Me
| Outstanding Recording (Acoustic/Folk)
| 
|-
! scope="row" | 1998
| Jill Jack
| Outstanding Vocalist (Acoustic/Folk)
| 
|-
! scope="row" | 1998
| Jill Jack
| Outstanding Vocalist (Rock/Pop)
| 
|-
! scope="row" | 1999
| Jill Jack
| Outstanding Vocalist (Rock/Pop)
| 
|-
! scope="row" | 1999
| Jill Jack
| Outstanding Artist/Group (Pop/Rock)
| 
|-
! scope="row" | 2000
| Jill Jack
| Outstanding Vocalist (Pop/Rock)
| 
|-
! scope="row" | 2005
| Jill Jack Live And Unplugged
| Outstanding Recording (Acoustic/Folk)
| 
|-
! scope="row" | 2005
| Jill Jack
| Outstanding Artist/Group (Pop/Rock)
| 
|-
! scope="row" | 2006
| Jill Jack
| Outstanding Acoustic Artist/Group
| 
|-
! scope="row" | 2006
| Moon and the Morning After
| Outstanding Acoustic/Folk Recording
| 
|-
! scope="row" | 2006
| Jill Jack
| Outstanding Acoustic/Folk Songwriter
| 
|-
! scope="row" | 2006
| Jill Jack
| Outstanding Acoustic/Folk Vocalist
| 
|-
! scope="row" | 2006
| Jill Jack
| Outstanding Pop Artist/Group
| 
|-
! scope="row" | 2007
| Jill Jack
| Outstanding Acoustic Artist/Group
| 
|-
! scope="row" | 2007
| Jill Jack
| Outstanding Acoustic/Folk Vocalist
| 
|-
! scope="row" | 2008
| Jill Jack
| Outstanding Acoustic Artist/Group
| 
|-
! scope="row" | 2008
| Jill Jack
| Outstanding Acoustic/Folk Vocalist
| 
|-
! scope="row" | 2010
| Songwriter Sessions
| Outstanding Acoustic/Folk Recording 
| 
|-
! scope="row" | 2010
| Jill Jack
| Outstanding Acoustic/Folk Vocalist
| 
|-
! scope="row" | 2011
| Jill Jack
| Outstanding Acoustic/Folk Songwriter
| 
|-
! scope="row" | 2011
| Jill Jack
| Outstanding Acoustic Artist/Group
| 
|-
! scope="row" | 2012
| Jill Jack
| Outstanding Acoustic/Folk Songwriter
| 
|-
! scope="row" | 2012
| Jill Jack
| Outstanding Folk Artist/Group
| 
|-
! scope="row" | 2013
| Sunflower Girl
| Outstanding Acoustic/Folk Recording
| 
|-
! scope="row" | 2013
| Jill Jack
| Outstanding Folk Artist/Group
| 
|-
! scope="row" | 2014
| Jill Jack
| Outstanding Acoustic/Folk Songwriter
| 
|-
! scope="row" | 2014
| Jill Jack
| Outstanding Folk Artist/Group
| 
|-
! scope="row" | 2015
| Jill Jack
| Outstanding Americana Songwriter
|

Other 

|-
|rowspan=2|2011
|International Songwriting Competition
|Americana
|Fallen (A Love Song)
|Semi-finalist 
|
|-
|Susanne Millsap's Performing Songwriter Showcase
|
|Jill Jack
|Finalist
|

References

External links
 www.JillJack.com

Year of birth missing (living people)
Living people
People from Ferndale, Michigan
Singer-songwriters from Michigan